Abdirashid Mohamed Hidig is a Somali political and a Member of Parliament in the Transitional Federal Parliament (TFP) of Somalia. There are 275 members of the Somali parliament. He was appointed on August 29, 2004, and will serve his term until 2009.

On January 9, he prematurely claimed the town of Ras Kamboni had been taken by the army of the Transitional Federal Government (TFG).

On January 10, he returned to Kismayo after touring to the front of the Battle of Ras Kamboni and spoke of 50 killed in the attacks. He said additional targets hit include Hayo, Garer, Bankajirow and Badmadowe. Other sources denied the additional attacks were made by the US. Ethiopian aircraft are also known to be operating in the combat area.

References

Abdirashid Mohamed Hidig on 1 April nominated Deputy defense Minister of TFG of Somalia

Year of birth missing (living people)
Living people
Members of the Transitional Federal Parliament